The 2017 Piraeus Bank Radivoj Korać Cup season was the 15th season of the Serbian national basketball cup tournament.

Teams

 1CS2–Cup of Serbia (2nd-tier) winner
 2League table after 13 rounds played: 1st–Dynamic (11–2)1, 2nd–Vršac (11–2), 3rd–Spartak (9–4), 4th–Dunav (8–5)

Bracket

Quarterfinals

Semifinals

Final

See also
2016–17 Basketball League of Serbia

External links
 Basketball Federation of Serbia 

2014
Radivoj
Serbia